Thomas Henry Greco Jr. (born October 9, 1936) is a community economist, who writes and consults on monetary exchange alternatives, including private credit clearing systems, complementary currencies and local currencies.

Education and career
Greco earned his bachelor's degree in chemical engineering from Villanova University, a Master of Business Administration (MBA) from the University of Rochester, and he pursued a Doctor of Philosophy (PhD) at Syracuse University. For fourteen years he taught economics, finance, statistics, entrepreneurship, and forecasting as a tenured faculty member in the college of business at Rochester Institute of Technology.

In 1979 Thomas Greco became a private consultant and community activist, working with local Rochester, New York peace and justice groups. From 1981 to 1990 he served as trustee and then president of the School of Living which promotes "self-governing communities that are democratic, humane, globally conscious and ecologically sound".

A frequent contributor to the decentralist publication Fourth World Review, Greco organized of the Fourth World Assembly and New Economics Symposium held in San Francisco in 1987. From 1989 to 1991 he co-edited Green Revolution, a journal dedicated to right education, right living and personal responsibility.

After moving to Arizona, Greco assisted in the development of LETSonora (a Local Exchange Trading System) and helped organize Tucson Traders, both now defunct, and in 1991 organized the Community Information Resource Center (CIRC) as a project of NEST, Inc., which promoted transformative approaches to community building.

Greco has authored four books on monetary theory and how practical monetary alternatives can empower communities by generating credit under local control. He has written for a wide range of journals, including the Internet Journal of Community Research, Alternate, Common Dreams, Transformation, Global Research, Reality Sandwich, Whole Earth Review, World Business Academy Perspectives, At Work, Earth Island Journal, the Catholic Worker, The Permaculture Activist, Yes! Magazine, Green Revolution, and others. Since 2019, he has hosted Beyond Money Podcast.

Bibliography
 The End of Money and the Future of Civilization, Chelsea Green (June 4, 2009). Also at Books.Google 
 Money: Understanding and Creating Alternatives to Legal Tender, PDF, Chelsea Green (November 1, 2001). 
 New Money for Healthy Communities, self-published, 1994.
 Money and Debt: A Solution to the Global Crisis, self-published, 1990.
 Chapter 7, "New Mechanisms for Monetary Exchange," in Willis W. Harman, Maya Porter, The New Business of Business: Sharing Responsibility for a Positive Global Future, Berrett-Koehler Publishers, 1997,

See also
Credit clearing
Credit money
 Commodity money
 Complementary currencies
 Digital cash
 Electronic money
 Economic Democracy
 Private bank
 Private currency

References

External links
 Beyond Money, Thomas H. Greco Jr.’s alternative currency blog.
 Thomas H. Greco Jr., Improving Local Currencies, or How To Make a Good Thing Better at Global Development Research Center.

1936 births
Living people
American economics writers
American male non-fiction writers
American economists
Monetary economists
Villanova University alumni
University of Rochester alumni
Syracuse University alumni